Raymond Everett Reach, Jr. (born August 3, 1948) is an American pianist, vocalist, guitarist, composer, arranger, music producer, and educator, named by AL.com as one of "30 Alabamians who changed jazz history." He serves as President and CEO of Ray Reach Music and Magic City Music Productions.

Reach has performed and recorded in various genres, including pop, R&B, Motown/soul, gospel, rock, classic rock, country (contemporary and traditional), contemporary Christian, classical, and jazz music, but is perhaps best known for his work in jazz, combining jazz piano stylings with Sinatra-style vocals. He resides in Birmingham, Alabama.

Career
Reach is a member of several active performing and recording groups, including the Magic City Jazz Orchestra (of which he is the founding director), the Ray Reach Orchestra, the Night Flight Big Band, and Cleveland Eaton and the Alabama Allstars. He leads his own group, Ray Reach and Friends, and is a former member of the SuperJazz Big Band. 

Reach has been a singer all his life and has been an active choral conductor for more than 35 years. His first public performance was at age four, singing a spiritual song at his home church, Minor United Methodist near Birmingham. His love for choral music began at Dixie Junior High School, where he sang in the choir under Tom Pinion, and later at Minor High School under John Fowler. He began formal voice lessons at age 15 with Andrew Gainey at Birmingham-Southern College and later entered Birmingham-Southern as a voice major, planning to pursue a career as a professional singer. To this day, Ray refers to his singing, among the many musical skills he possesses, as the "best thing he does musically."

During his college undergraduate years, Ray began his choral directing career at Village Falls United Methodist Church. Following this, he was a paid singer at Fairview United Methodist Church, then later was choir director at Norwood United Methodist Church. Subsequently, he sang at First United Methodist Church of Birmingham (under Sam Owens and later under Hugh Thomas) and was baritone soloist and choir singer at Independent Presbyterian Church in Birmingham under choirmaster and organist Joseph Schreiber. He also sang with the Birmingham Civic Opera and, while at Birmingham-Southern, sang lead roles in operas such as The Telephone, Amahl and the Night Visitors, The Barber of Seville, and The Marriage of Figaro.

In 1991 he returned to Minor High School as the choral director.

As a composer, he has written and arranged five Broadway-style musicals for Birmingham Children's Theatre: Rumplestiltskin, The Perfect Prince, The Bravo Bus, Backstage Baby, and Tuxedo Junction.

In January 2008, Reach performed as guest artist with the Howard Paul Trio at the Jazz Corner on Hilton Head Island, South Carolina, a venue he returned to with his own trio on October 3 and 4.

On March 20, 2008, at the invitation of Chuck Leishman, publisher of The Birmingham Weekly, Reach directed the house band at the 2008 Birmingham Area Music Awards.  From July 20–26, 2008, he performed at the W. C. Handy Music Festival. On August 21, 2008, he was featured on the "Tapestry" radio show, hosted by Greg Bass on WBHM Radio 90.3 FM in Birmingham, Alabama. On September 27, 2008, The Ray Reach Quartet, featuring saxophonist Gary Wheat, drummer Steve Ramos, and Count Basie bassist Cleveland Eaton with guest New York trumpeter Lew Soloff, appeared at the Taste of 4th Avenue Jazz Festival in Birmingham, Alabama.

On April 23, 2018, Reach was arrested by U.S. Marshals in Alabama for the possession of child pornography.

Selected discography
As leader
 Especially for You (1994) - with Robert Dickson on bass, Alabama Jazz Hall of Fame inductee Sonny Harris on drums, and Gary Neil McLean on saxophone and flute.
 Have Yourself a Jazzy Little Christmas (2005) - with Sonny Harris on drums, Chris Wendle on bass and Gary Wheat on saxophone.

As vocalist, pianist, arranger and co-producer
 Ellis Marsalis and the SuperJazz Big Band. UAB SuperJazz, Featuring Ellis Marsalis (2001)

As producer
Uncle Bud's Lectro Wood Experience
 Lou Marini and the Magic City Jazz Orchestra. Lou's Blues (2001)

References

Notes

Sources
 Ray Reach biography Allaboutjazz.com

External links

 
 Official YouTube channel
 Article names Ray Reach as one of 30 Alabamians that changed jazz history
 Video by Jerry Henry done at Nutthouse Recording in Sheffield, Alabama
 Video of Blue Lou Marini and Ray Reach at St. Martin's In The Pines, Birmingham, Alabama
 Video of Ray Reach with Ken Watters and friends at the 2012 W.C. Handy Music Festival

American jazz musicians
American jazz educators
American music educators
Jazz musicians from Alabama
Music directors
1948 births
Living people
Musicians from Birmingham, Alabama
University of Alabama at Birmingham faculty
Magic City Jazz Orchestra members